Lance Garvin is an American musician and, along with Bruce Fitzhugh, DJ Johnson and Jason Truby, a founding member of the Christian metal band Living Sacrifice. Garvin is mostly known for using a Ride Cymbal in modern metal without making it sound thinner.

Garvin is also the drummer of Christian metal band Soul Embraced and has played with the bands Throwdown and Zao as well. He formed the band Kill System, along with fellow Soul Embraced members, Chad Moore and Rocky Gray, and former Evanescence guitarist John LeCompt.

When Living Sacrifice prepared to release their documentary, the release was delayed by COVID-19, with Garvin contracting the sickness. Following his recovery, the plan to work on new material was also delayed by Garvin breaking his leg.

Influence and legacy

Garvin has stated that his inspiration was Ace Frehley of Kiss:

With Living Sacrifice, Garvin influenced many metal bands, such as As I Lay Dying, Throwdown, 7 Horns 7 Eyes, Saving Grace, Demon Hunter and Underoath.

Garvin, along with Brandan Trahan of Impending Doom and xDEATHSTARx, Matt Greiner of August Burns Red and Ted Kirkpatrick of Tourniquet, are all considered influential drummers for Christian metal.

Garvin has been compared by his bandmate Bruce Fitzhugh and others to Slayer's former drummer, Dave Lombardo.

Bands 
Current
 Hope Deferred - drums (2021–present)
 Living Sacrifice – drums (1989–2003, 2005, 2008–present)
 Soul Embraced – drums (1999–2008, 2014–present)

Former
 Kill System – drums (2002–2003)
 Heroes Among Thieves – guitars, drums (2007–2008)
The Satire – drums

Touring
 The Blamed – drums (1996, 1999)
 Zao – drums (2003)
 Throwdown – drums (2009–2011)
 Ironside – drums (2019–present)

Discography
 With Living Sacrifice
Not Yielding to Ungodly (1989)
Living Sacrifice (1991)
Nonexistent (1992)
Metamorphosis (1993)
Inhabit (1994)
Reborn (1997)
The Hammering Process (2000)
Subtle Alliance (2002)
Conceived in Fire (2002)
In Memoriam (2005)
Death Machine (2008)
The Infinite Order (2010)
Ghost Thief (2013)

 With Soul Embraced
The Fleshless (1999)
For the Incomplete (2000)
This Is My Blood (2002)
Immune (2003)
Dead Alive (2008)

 With Kill System
Kill System (2002)

As additional musician
Forever by The Blamed (1999)
Burning Bridges by Haste the Day (2004)
In the Clutches of the Novae by Mothwind (2014)

References

American heavy metal drummers
Christian metal musicians
Living people
Year of birth missing (living people)
American performers of Christian music
American rock drummers
Soul Embraced members
Living Sacrifice members
Throwdown (band) members